Ali-Asghar Shahbazi (November 1922 – 29 November 2020) was an Iranian actor.

Shahbazi died on 29 November 2020 from cardiopulmonary arrest at the age of 98.

Career
Before starting acting career, Shahbazi was a bank employee who was not interested in cinema. Shahbazi's debut was in the film Under the Peach Tree by Iraj Tahmasb. He was cast as  Nader's father after Asghar Farhadi was watching that picture. For his role in A Separation, he won the Silver Bear for Best Actor (as part of ensemble) at 61st Berlin International Film Festival in 2011.

Filmography 
 Under the Peach Tree (2007)
 A Separation (2011)
 Five to Five (2013)

References

External links 

1922 births
2020 deaths
People from Tehran
Male actors from Tehran
Iranian male film actors
Silver Bear for Best Actor winners